Rogério Bacalhau is the current mayor of the Faro Municipality of Portugal.

References

Mayors of places in Portugal
People from Faro, Portugal
Living people
Year of birth missing (living people)
Place of birth missing (living people)
21st-century Portuguese politicians